Uttar Charilam is a village in West Tripura District, Tripura, India. The population is 10,793. 5,516 people are male. 5,277 are female.

References

Villages in West Tripura district